Pug is a nickname of:

 Walden L. Ainsworth (1886-1960), US Navy World War II vice admiral
 Pug Bennett (1874–1935), American Major League Baseball player
 Pug Cavet (1889–1966), American Major League Baseball player
 Russell Daugherity (1902-1971), American football player
 Peter George Davis (1923-2011), British Second World War Royal Marines lieutenant colonel
 Pug Griffin (1896-1951), American Major League Baseball player
 Hastings Ismay, 1st Baron Ismay (1887-1965), British general and Winston Churchill's chief military adviser in the Second World War
 Pug Lund (1913–1994), American football player, member of the College Football Hall of Fame
 Clarence "Pug" Manders (1913-1985), American National Football League running back
 Alex Pourteau (born 1969), professional wrestler nicknamed "The Pug"
 Pug Rentner (1910–1978), American National Football League halfback and quarterback
 Pug Southerland (1911–1949), United States Navy World War II flying ace
 Charles Upham (1908-1994), New Zealand captain twice awarded the Victoria Cross during the Second World War
 Pug Vaughan (1911-1964), American National Football League player

Lists of people by nickname